Anne Marit Godal (born 20 November 1972) is a Norwegian encyclopedist.

She studied political science at the University of Oslo and has had positions in the Norwegian Labour Party and No to the EU. From 2011 to 2016 she was editor-in-chief of Store norske leksikon [the Great Norwegian encyclopedia], Store medisinske leksikon (an associated medical encyclopedia), and Norsk biografisk leksikon (a biographical encyclopedia).
When she took over the editorship, these works were in danger of running out of funding, but in her term as editor-in-chief she secured university funding for their long-term survival. In 2018 Godal published an anthology of poems: "Things have to change, soon, it´s coming - 100 Norwegian poems of community and fight" (Alt skal bli forandra snart. 100 norske dikt om fellesskap og kamp), together with co editor Leif Høghaug.

References

1972 births
Living people
Norwegian encyclopedists
Women encyclopedists
Norwegian women non-fiction writers
University of Oslo alumni
Norwegian political scientists
Women political scientists